Tsukasa Hirano (born 28 April 1983 in Osaka) is a Japanese triathlete. He  has represented Japan in ITU world cup from 2001 to 2011. He won several triathlon races through domestic and international races such as 2005 Japan Cup and the 2010 Asia Cup Philippines. After he retired from professional sports in 2012, he became the head coach for the NAS triathlon club.

References 

1983 births
Japanese male triathletes
Living people
Sportspeople from Osaka
20th-century Japanese people
21st-century Japanese people